The 1996 Speedway Grand Prix of Italy was the second race of the 1996 Speedway Grand Prix season. It took place on 1 June in the Santa Marina Stadium in Lonigo, Italy It was the first Italian SGP and was won by Danish rider Hans Nielsen. It was the second win of his career.

Starting positions draw 

The Speedway Grand Prix Commission nominated Stefano Alfonso as Wild Card.

Heat details

The intermediate classification

See also 
 Speedway Grand Prix
 List of Speedway Grand Prix riders

References

External links 
 FIM-live.com
 SpeedwayWorld.tv

Speedway Grand Prix of Italy
I
1996